One Night Only is the second album by British alternative rock band One Night Only. It was released on 23 August 2010.

The new songs were first performed at the SXSW festival in March 2010. The band played "Say You Don't Want It", "Forget My Name", "Chemistry", "Anything", "Got It All Wrong" and "All I Want". On their June 2010 tour, they played "Never Be The Same" and "Bring Me Back Down" in place of "Anything" and "Got It All Wrong".

The first single from the album was "Say You Don't Want It", released on 16 August 2010, a week before the album.

"Chemistry" was announced as the second single from the album. Filming for the music video took place in Spain in mid-August.

"All I Want" was offered as a free download.

The album entered the UK iTunes Top 10, making a first week appearance at number 36 on the UK Albums Chart. It left the Top 100 the following week.

Track listing

References

2010 albums
One Night Only (band) albums
Albums produced by Ed Buller
Vertigo Records albums